Saturnina was a Christian virgin martyr, now considered to be purely legendary.

Saturnina may also refer to:

 Lollia Saturnina, 1st century Roman noblewoman, a mistress of Emperor Caligula
 Volusia Saturnina, ancient Roman noblewoman, mother of Lollia Saturnina
 Saturnina Hidalgo (1850–1913), sister of Philippine national hero José Rizal
 Saturnina Rodríguez de Zavalía (1823–1896), Argentine Roman Catholic beatified nun, founder of the order of the Handmaids of the Heart of Jesus

Feminine given names